Michaela Endler (born 20 December 1945) is a German former cross-country skier who competed in the 1968 Winter Olympics and  in the 1972 Winter Olympics.

Cross-country skiing results

Olympic Games

World Championships

References

1945 births
Living people
German female cross-country skiers
Olympic cross-country skiers of West Germany
Cross-country skiers at the 1968 Winter Olympics
Cross-country skiers at the 1972 Winter Olympics
Cross-country skiers at the 1976 Winter Olympics